Zhengzhou BRT Route B6 was a discontinued bus rapid transit route operated by Zhengzhou Bus.

History
The route was commenced on 28 April 2016, together with two interval services (east interval and west interval).

On 26 March 2018, the two interval services were merged into one, designated as B601.

On 26 May 2019, the route together with Route B601 stopped service due to the adjustment of bus routes after the opening of Zhengzhou Metro Line 5.

Route
The route was loop line running on Dianchang Road, North 3rd Ring Road, Zhongzhou Avenue, Weilai Road, Hanghai Road, Changjiang Road, Tongbai Road and Qinling Road, with Dianchang Road Bus Terminus as the terminal station.

Branch routes
The route had a number of branch routes, which were free-interchangeable with the main route.
Interval services:
 B601: Dianchang Road B/T ↔ Defeng Street station
Feeder routes:
3: Huanggang Temple ↔ Dongjiancai
37: Zhongyuan Road and West 3rd Ring Road ↔ Zijingshan (Renmin Road)
79: Huayuankou B/T ↔ Bishagang
84: Zhengshou South Coach Station ↔ Huagong Road and West 3rd Ring Road
111: Metro Nansihuan station ↔ Yixueyuan
129: Zhengzhou East railway station Coach Station ↔ Zhengzhou South Coach Station
179: Zhengzhou railway station (West Plaza) ↔ Jiangang
193: Zidong Road B/T ↔ Minhang Garden B/T
204: Houcang ↔ Daxue Road and South 3rd Ring Road
206: Convention and Exhibition Center (Jiuru Road) ↔ Zhengzhou railway station (South Terminus)
213: Zhengzhou railway station (West Plaza) ↔ Tongzhan Road B/T
263: Huayuankou B/T ↔ Zhengzhou No.7 People's Hospital
B15: North 3rd Ring Road and Zhongzhou Avenue ↔ Shihua Road B/T
B16: Shangwu Inner Ring Road and Shangwu E. 1st Street ↔ Ganjiang Road B/T
B17: Zhengzhou railway station (South Terminus) ↔ Jingkai 8th Avenue B/T
B18: Gaocun (Wenhua Road) ↔ Minsheng E. Street and Zhengguang Road
B19: Liuzhuang (Huayuan Road) ↔ Convention and Exhibition Center (Inner Ring)
B25: Zhengzhou East railway station ↔ Zhongzhou Avenue and Nongye Road
B32: Kexue Avenue B/T ↔ Zijingshan (Huayuan Road)
B37: Henan Sports Center ↔ Zijingshan (Huayuan Road)
B38: North 3rd Ring Road and Shakou Road ↔ Zhengzhou East railway station
B50: Gaocun (Fengqing Road) ↔ Zijingshan (Huayuan Road)
B51: Kaiyuan Road B/T ↔ Wulongkou B/T
B52: Zhengzhou Institute of Finance and Economics ↔ Nongke Road and Jingsan Road
B53: Zhengzhou Bus Company ↔ Wenhua Road and Sanquan Road (N)
B66: North 3rd Ring Road and Nanyang Road ↔ Jinhe Park

Fleet
Yutong ZK6128HGK (former)
Yutong ZK6139HGA (former)
Yutong ZK6180CHEVNPG3
Yutong E12
Yutong H12

References

Bus Routes in Zhengzhou
Zhengzhou BRT